Terraform or Terraformer may refer to:

 Terraforming, a hypothetical planetary engineering process
 Terraform (software), an infrastructure as configuration software tool

Music
 Terraform (Shellac album), 1998
 Terraform (Steve Roach and Loren Nerell album), 2006
 TerraForm, an album by the Sam Roberts Band, 2016
 "Terraform", a song by the Dandy Warhols from Why You So Crazy, 2019
 Terraformer (album), by Knut, 2005
 Terraformer, an album by Thank You Scientist, 2019

Literature
 The Terraformers, a 2023 science fiction novel by Annalee Newitz

See also
 Terra Formars, a Japanese manga series